Imam Bargah
'  Imam Bargah is a place where Shia mourn the martyrdom of Imam Hussain, the grandson of Prophet Muhammad, as he was martyred in Karbala on the 10th of Muharram. To refresh the memory of the Imam's martyrdom, the Shia worship him in the Imam Bargah.
 امام بارگاہیں اور مساجد شیعہ اسلام میں دو مختلف مقامات ہیں۔ ایک مسجد کو نماز کے لیے استعمال کیا جاتا ہے، جب کہ امام بارگاہ اسلام کی تبلیغ کے لیے ہے اور اس کا بنیادی مقصد خواتین اور چھوٹے بچوں کے داخلے پر پابندی لگا کر مسجد کی پاکیزگی کو برقرار رکھنا ہے۔ دوسری طرف، ہر کوئی (مرد یا عورت) امام بارگاہ جا سکتا ہے۔]

A ḥosayniya or hussainiya (Arabic: حسينية husayniyya), also known as an ashurkhana, imambargah, or imambara''', is a congregation hall for Twelver Shia Muslim commemoration ceremonies, especially those associated with the Mourning of Muharram. Hussainiya is a multitude hall for the mourning of  Muharram and other commemoration rituals of Shia that its name gets from Husayn ibn Ali, the grandson of Muhammad.

Terminology
A hussainiya is different from a mosque. The name comes from Husayn ibn Ali, the third of the Twelve Imams and the grandson of the Islamic prophet Muhammad. Husayn was martyred at the Battle of Karbala on 10 October 680 CE during the reign of Ubayd Allah ibn Ziyad. The Shia commemorate his martyrdom every year on Ashura, the 10th day of Muharram. There are also other ceremonies which are held during the year in hussainiyas, including religious commemorations unrelated to Ashura. and may not necessarily hold jumu'ah (Friday congregational prayer).

In South Asia, a hussainiya can also be referred to as an imambara, imambargah, or ashurkhana. In Afghanistan and Central Asia, it is also called a takyakhana. In Bahrain and the United Arab Emirates, it is called a ma'tam''.

History
From the time of the Safavid was ruling in Iran, when Shia tended to hold the religious and mourning ceremonies, not only the passageways or the roofed places were used for the religious communities, even to make the Hoseynias and also Takyeh(s) became commonplace. Any Hosseynia had some booths (or rooms) and arcades, both in large and small sizes. Also in many alleys and streets, on the days near Ashoura, the religious people blackened the walls and the roofs and illuminated them, by the colorful lights... From the age of Zand, many bigger and vaster Takye(s) was made just to hold Tazia, where there was a stage by the height of one meter from the floor, to show the different senses of Tazieh. Expense of the Hussainiya is provided by Charitable donations and endowments.

Usage
Hussainiya was used during Muharram, Safar, and Ramadan for mourning, Rawda Khwani, Sineh Zani (a Customary form of mourning ceremony which shows their grief with chest-beating). Also, Hussainiya is a place for accommodations of passengers and pilgrims and feeding the poor.
Since hussainiya serves as a focal point for Shi’i gathering, it also plays a very significant role in consolidation of religious identity specially for Shi’i population in diaspora.

Notable hussainias 

Hosseinieh Azam Zanjan Mosque, in Zanjan, Iran
Azakhana Syed Dost Ali, Mohallah Katkoi, Amroha, built in 1766/1767
Hussaini Dalan, in Dhaka, Bangladesh
Prithimpasha Nawab Bari Imambara, in Kulaura, Bangladesh
Bara Imambara, in Lucknow, India
Chhota Imambara, in Lucknow, India
Hooghly Imambara, in Hooghly (W.B.), India
Nizamat Imambara, in Murshidabad, India
Badshahi Ashurkhana, in Hyderabad, India
Dar uz Zehra, Alipur, Karnataka, India.
Hosseiniyeh Ershad, in Tehran, Iran
Hussaini Imambara Asim Raza Abdi, in 100/46, Colonel Ganj Kanpur,
Imambara Ghufran Ma'ab, in Lucknow, India
Imambargah Mir Vilayat Husain, in Karari Allahabad, India
Azakhana Wazeer-un-Nisa, located in Amroha, India. The Azakhana was built in 1802 (1226 Hijri) with one Mosque.
Imambargah Haveli Sa'daat, one of the oldest Imambargahs in Gujranwala, Pakistan. It was built by the Naqvi Sadat family, who migrated from Fatehgarh Churian, Punjab, India. 
Imambargah Bait Aal e Imran, in Kotla Arab Ali Khan, Gujrat, Pakistan. The site was donated by Choudhary Ghulam Hassan, a sunni by birth, and his wife in 1979.
Imam Bargah mosque, Afghanistan, targeted in the 2021 Kandahar bombing

See also 
 Ashura
 Mourning of Muharram
 Battle of Karbala
 Husayn ibn Ali
 Hussaini Dalan
 Tasu'a
 Imambaras of Lucknow
 Rawda Khwani

References 

 
Islamic architectural elements
Islamic architecture
Cultural depictions of Husayn ibn Ali
Islamic terminology
Battle of Karbala